Omar Mussa is the name of:

Omar Mussa (footballer, born 1980), Burundian footballer
Omar Mussa (footballer, born 2000), Belgian footballer